Katie Gallagher is an American fashion designer.

Katie Gallagher may also refer to:

 Katie Gallagher, a contestant on Survivor
 Katie Gallagher, a pen name of American author Sarah Addison Allen

See also
 Katy Gallagher, an Australian politician